Albalat dels Sorells is a municipality in the comarca of Horta Nord in the Valencian Community, Spain.

Notable people
Nerea Martí (born 2002), racing driver

References

Municipalities in the Province of Valencia
Horta Nord